The Bedford TA  (also called Bedford A) is a medium-duty truck produced by Bedford Vehicles from 1953 to 1958, as a replacement for the older Bedford M series which started production in 1939 and was eventually discontinued in 1952. In total around 200,000 TA trucks were built until it was eventually modernised as the newer TJ.

The truck was an all new vehicle compared to its predecessor and competed with vehicles such as the Commer Superpoise and Leyland Comet trucks, although the TA was more popular due to its larger engines, which were a development of the American Stovebolt units.

Development 

With the end of the Second World War, the Bedford factories had been converted into suitable only for military production for the war effort and were in a precarious state, so the revert process back to civilian production was not an easy one; effectively, the company limped on with the outdated pre-war Bedford M series and O series models. In order to remain profitable Bedford decided to prioritize their production mostly for export, something that happened with almost all British vehicle manufacturers during the early post-war years, in a new fashion called "Export or Die" that was also responsible for the development of the legendary Land Rover.

During that time General Motors, the parent of Vauxhall Motors that controlled Bedford, was thriving in the United States with new models such as the Chevrolet Bel Air sedans and convertibles alongside the Chevrolet Advance Design commercial vehicles, which were the most popular light-duty truck at the American market during that time around. To cut costs it was decided to import a Chevrolet Advance Design in the Luton factory to create a new model based on the tooling of the American model instead of entirely developing a new one.

During the launch of the TA series, many motoring presses noted the similarities between the Advance Design and the TA, and suggested that some panels were even interchangeable but Bedford proclaimed that apart from a similarity in design (that was also applied to the re-designed Opel Blitz) there was no mechanical commonality between these trucks since if the company was going to "copy" the design of the American truck, there were going to be production problems, since the Bedford truck was bigger in almost all dimensions and the Advance Design was ready to be discontinued in its home market. Nevertheless, the American-inspired styling was considered fresh in the United Kingdom, a key feature that made the truck very successful.

When the TA was released, it was presented to dealers and large fleet operators, that gave it mostly positive reviews, and initial sales were much higher than the production capacity at the Bedford factories, leading to shortages and delays in production. During the 1954 model year, some changes included a new bonnet pressing with a raised T-shaped ridge that strengthened the vehicle's overall front end.

The TA series was produced in many versions, including box trucks, chassis cabs, dropside trucks and a police variant was also made for export to Hong Kong. In 1957 the series was modernized as the TD series and received a slightly different front end. Some time later the vehicle received a different axle ratio. Production ended in 1958, with 37,758 being produced at that year.

Like other Bedford vehicles, it was assembled locally from knock-down kits in Australia and New Zealand. It was also exported all around the Commonwealth countries where it had moderate success. A few vehicles were also exported to Pakistan although they did not had the success that the TA's successor would.

It was planned to replace the vehicle with an all new truck but due to the styling still remaining popular and Bedford focusing more on the TK and RL, it was decided to simply facelift the model and rename it to the TJ range. The TJ, although finally proving not very popular in its home market, became an instant export success (especially for developing countries) and continued in production until 1998.

Versions 
 Bedford A 2Z: ambulance version.
 Bedford A 3L ZG: crew bus version.
 A version with a forward control fire engine body made by Miles and Dennis was also built on the TA chassis.
 Bedford A4: long wheel base bus built for RAF.
 Bedford A 4SS: semi truck variant.

References

External links
 Bedford A2C
 bedford trucks
 Bedford Light Truck 
 1953 Bedford truck

TA
Rear-wheel-drive vehicles
Vans
1950s cars
 
Articulated buses